Saundatti is a taluk in Belgaum district of Karnataka, India.

References

Villages in Belagavi district